Lake Norconian is an artificial lake in Norco, Riverside County, California.

Lake Norconian was created in the early 1920s as part of the Norconian Resort.  This  lake was equipped with a boat house and pavilion.  It was the site where a few 1930s movies were filmed.

The lake and resort were acquired by the US Navy in 1941; the area is operated as Naval Surface Warfare Center Corona, part of the Naval Surface Warfare Center.

See also
List of lakes in California

References

External links
 

Temescal Mountains
Norconian
History of Riverside County, California
Norco, California
1920s establishments in California